Surgutneftegas is a Russian oil and gas company created by merging several previously state-owned companies owning large oil and gas reserves in Western Siberia. The company's headquarters are located in Surgut, Khanty-Mansi Autonomous Okrug. In the 2020 Forbes Global 2000, Surgutneftgas was ranked as the 251st -largest public company in the world.

Surgutneftegas includes a large oil refinery in Kirishi, Leningrad Oblast, operated by the Kirishinefteorgsintez subsidiary. The company is also engaged in fuel retail activities in north-west Russia by cooperating with the Petersburg Fuel Company. Surgutneftegas is also a shareholder of Oneximbank (Объединённый экспортно-импортный банк).
From the beginning Surgutneftegas has been led by president and director general Vladimir Bogdanov, who had run the Surgut oil fields since 1983.

History
Surgutneftegas was created in 1993 as a joint stock company. In 1995, the company won a tender for huge oil fields in the Khanty–Mansi Autonomous Okrug. The company also gained permission to build an export terminal in the Batareynaya Bay of the Gulf of Finland and a pipeline between it and the Kirishi refinery.

Surgutneftegas was widely believed to be behind Baikalfinansgrup which acquired YUKOS' main oil production facility Yuganskneftegaz at a controversial auction in 2004.

Operations
Surgutneftegas is the leading oil supplier to Belarus, accounting in 2006 for some 30% of the total deliveries. The company also developed its foreign contacts, including talks with Iran, Libya and pre-war Iraq on taking part in oil extraction projects.

According to the Hoover company review, Surgutneftegas employs more than 82,000 people and made $24 billion sales in 2007.

Kirish Oil Refinery

Construction of the Kirishi Oil Refinery was launched in 1961 in the town of Kirishi, Leningrad Region. The first phase of the refinery was commissioned in March 1966. The refinery was designed to cover the fuel needs of the north-western region of the Soviet Union. The conversion level of the refinery was not very deep, with a high degree of masut (residue) production. The latter was also delivered to the Baltic states, Belarus, and Ukraine.

In 1980 the plant was reconstructed and started diesel hydrotreating unit with capacity of two million tonnes per year. The main fractionation tower K-5 weighing 335.2 tons, diameter of 5 m and a length of 62 m was delivered by "Spetstyazhavtotrans" from the factory "Dzerzhinskhimmash".

In 1993, the refinery was incorporated into the OOO Surgutneftegas and renamed as the OOO Industrial Enterprise Kirishnefteorgsintez (OOO KINEF).

See also

List of oil exploration and production companies

References

External links
Official site
OAO Surgutneftegas

Natural gas companies of Russia
Oil companies of Russia
Energy companies established in 1993
Non-renewable resource companies established in 1993
Companies listed on the Moscow Exchange
Companies based in Khanty-Mansi Autonomous Okrug